In applied statistics, Vincentization was described by Ratcliff (1979), and is named after biologist S. B. Vincent (1912), who used something very similar to it for constructing learning curves at the beginning of the 1900s. It basically consists of averaging  subjects' estimated or elicited quantile functions in order to define group quantiles from which  can be constructed.

To cast it in its greatest generality, let  represent arbitrary (empirical or theoretical) distribution functions and define their corresponding quantile functions by

 

The Vincent average of the 's is then computed as

 

References

Applied statistics